Seiki Digital is a television manufacturer with its corporate headquarters at 1550 Valley Vista Dr., Suite 210, Diamond Bar, CA 91765, USA. Seiki Digital is wholly owned by the Chinese-based Tsinghua Tongfang Company. The company is noted for manufacturing very inexpensive HD and Ultra HD LCD televisions.

History
The company was founded in 2010 in Orange, California, and is headquartered in Diamond Bar, California. This is also the headquarters of Westinghouse Electronics, another subsidiary of Tsinghua Tongfang. In 2018, the company began manufacturing home kitchen appliances.

References

External links
Seiki Digital

Consumer electronics brands
Display technology companies
Manufacturing companies based in Greater Los Angeles
American subsidiaries of foreign companies
Diamond Bar, California
Electronics companies of the United States
Companies based in Los Angeles County, California
American companies established in 2010
Electronics companies established in 2010
2010 establishments in California